Francis Stuart Chapin (3 February 1888 – 7 July 1974) was an American sociologist and educator; he was a professor of sociology at the University of Minnesota from 1922 to 1953.

Background
He received his bachelor's degree from Columbia University in 1909, as well as his PhD from the same school in 1911.

Career
He taught economics at Wellesley College for one year. He then moved to Smith College where he taught sociology and served as department chair (1912–1921). In 1920 he was elected as a Fellow of the American Statistical Association.

He played an important role in creation of a quantitative, statistical sociology in the United States in the years between World War I and World War II (1920–40).

He also served as the 25th President of the American Sociological Association. He was a prime mover in the creation of the Social Science Research Council.

Legacy
His grandson, F. Stuart Chapin III, is a professor of ecology at the University of Alaska.

One of his students was writer Myra Page.

References

External links
http://special.lib.umn.edu/findaid/xml/uarc00962.xml

1888 births
1974 deaths
20th-century American educators
American sociologists
Columbia College (New York) alumni
University of Minnesota faculty
Fellows of the American Statistical Association
Presidents of the American Sociological Association
Smith College faculty
American Sociological Review editors